Moustafa Abdelal is an Egyptian gymnast. He competed in the 1948 Summer Olympics.

References

Gymnasts at the 1948 Summer Olympics
Egyptian male artistic gymnasts
Olympic gymnasts of Egypt